Air Vice Marshal David Ralph Grey Rennison,  is a former senior Royal Air Force officer.

RAF career
Rennison joined the Royal Air Force in 1970. He was appointed Director of the Defence Information Infrastructure (DII) Programme in 2003, and Director-General Logistics (Strike) in 2006 before he retired in 2007.

References

Living people
Companions of the Order of the Bath
Royal Air Force air marshals
Year of birth missing (living people)